Homer Harris Casteel (April 14, 1879 - December 11, 1958) was an American politician in the state of Mississippi who served in the Mississippi Senate and as Lieutenant Governor of Mississippi from 1920-1924.

Career
Casteel was the son of Marion Lafayette Castell (1833-1892) and his wife Virginia Lindsey Casteel (1843-1914). He went to the public schools in Leake County and attended Mississippi Central Normal School in Walnut Grove. In 1911 he was living in Pickens, Mississippi and was elected to the state senate from Holmes County (21st district). He was re-elected in 1915. In 1919 Casteel ran successfully for lieutenant governor on a ticket with fellow Democrat Lee M. Russell. While Governor Russell was out of state briefly, Casteel issued several controversial pardons; one was challenged in court but was held valid by the Mississippi Supreme Court. Casteel also cast a tie-breaking vote to pass the Nineteenth Amendment in the Mississippi Senate in 1920 (although the amendment was then voted down, for a second time, in the House.)

After his term in office he purchased 400 acres near Canton, Mississippi and built a home there named "Poverty Hill". In 1927 he was elected to another term in the state senate, this time from Madison County, and served as senate president pro tem. He then was appointed to the Tax Commission, serving until 1934, and in 1935 was elected to the Railroad Commission, which was renamed the Public Service Commission at his suggestion. Re-elected three times, he served 16 years on the commission, serving most of those years as chairman. In 1941 he moved from the plantation to a house in the town of Canton.

Casteel was a delegate to the 1928 Democratic National Convention in Houston, Texas and served as the chairman of the Mississippi delegation. On the last day of the convention he rode a donkey down the aisle to his seat carrying an image of nominee Al Smith.

Family
On June 9, 1913 Casteel married Jean Calahan (1889-1914) of Pickens, who died September 9, 1914. On August 17, 1917 he married Annie Winters (1890-1970). They had one son, artist Homer Casteel Jr. (1919-1972).

Casteel is buried in the Canton City Cemetery in Canton.

References

1879 births
1958 deaths
People from Walnut Grove, Mississippi
People from Holmes County, Mississippi
People from Canton, Mississippi
Democratic Party Mississippi state senators
Methodists from Mississippi
Lieutenant Governors of Mississippi
Presidents pro tempore of the Mississippi State Senate
20th-century American politicians